Athos II was a passenger and cargo liner for Compagnie des Messageries Maritimes making her maiden voyage from Marseilles 25 March 1927 starting on the line's Far East service serving Marseilles, Malaya, Indo-China, Hong Kong, Shanghai, Kobe and Yokohama. The ship, laid down in 1923 and launched 12 November 1925, had been completed by Aktien-Gesellschaft „Weser", Bremen and delivered to the French as part of World War I reparations.

The ship started World War II in French national service until captured by the Allies in North Africa and then being turned over to the United States War Shipping Administration by Free French authorities at Casablanca for operation as a troop transport allocated to the United States Army until returned to the French government in March 1946.

Athos II transported French troops to French Indochina, Korea, during the Suez intervention and lastly Algeria in the postwar years as well as a period carrying North African pilgrims to Jeddah.

World War II

French national service
After passage through the Suez Canal and return to France Athos II began Marseilles, Egypt and Syria service until the 22 June 1940 German-French armistice when the ship was laid up at Alexandria, Egypt along with other French ships seized in the Suez Canal and Egyptian waters. In addition to the merchant ships was a French naval force, Force X, under Admiral Rene-Emile Godfroy that had been operating with the British fleet out of Alexandria. After the fall of France with German controlled Vichy France controlling French ports the French were faced with the options of continuing with the Allies under General de Gaulle, demilitarizing or being sunk by the British. The British action against the French fleet at Oran stalled demilitarization but that resumed after further negotiations with the result reduction of French fleet's manpower, some 4,000 men, to one-third was required. Two thousand French sailors had already left Alexandria when Athos II was allowed to sail on 13 July 1940 with the 1,000 remaining personnel of Force X and some merchant crew members to France. In September 1940 repatriated French troops from Syria and then became the guard ship at Algiers until captured by the Allies in November 1942 during Operation Torch.

Allied service with United States War Shipping Administration
On 8 March 1943 Athos II was turned over to United States War Shipping Administration (WSA) control by French Authorities at Casablanca and on 1 April 1943 began operation as a WSA transport allocated to the United States Army and operated by French Lines, Inc. as agent.

Athos II underwent conversion May—November 1943 for WSA troop service by Turbine Engineering Corporation of New York. In December the ship made a voyage to the United Kingdom, returning in January, 1944. On 21 January 1944 the ship left New York for the Southwest Pacific but engine trouble forced a return to Panama from the Galápagos Islands before again getting underway on 8 March. In continuing the round-the-world trip Athos II then called at Bora Bora, Fremantle, Bombay, Cape Town, departing 8 May but again having to undergo repairs until 9 June, crossing  the Atlantic to Recife to arrive 1 July 1944 in New York. Subsequent operations were between New York and Naples, Le Havre, Southampton and Plymouth. After two round trips to Naples the ship underwent extensive repairs in New York before resuming operations in February 1945. Athos II returned to New York after repairs and was released from troop transport service January 1946 to be returned to French authorities by WSA.

Return to French service
On 23 March 1946 Athos II was turned over to the French Shipping Mission at New York.

Footnotes

References

Bibliography

External links
 L'ATHOS II (extensive photographic collection)
 Le retour de l'ATHOS II à la France début 1946
 British Pathé silent film: French Volunteers For Korea (1950) (close shots of ship and troops boarding)
 British Pathé  silent film: New Troops In Algeria 1956 (Troops debarking Athos II in Algeria)
 List of children on board the SS Athos II who came to the United States from Marseilles, France. All of them had been cared for by OSE (United States Holocaust Memorial Museum)
 Builder's hull drawings
 Builder's deck plan

1925 ships
Passenger ships of France
Ships built in Bremen (state)
Troop ships of the War Shipping Administration
Troop ships of France